Will & Grace is an American sitcom created by Max Mutchnick and David Kohan about the relationship between best friends Will Truman (Eric McCormack), a gay lawyer, and Grace Adler (Debra Messing), a straight interior designer. It was broadcast on NBC from September 21, 1998 to May 18, 2006, for a total of eight seasons. During its original run, Will & Grace was one of the most successful television series with gay principal characters. It was revived by NBC in 2017 for a ninth and tenth season.

Despite initial criticism for its particular portrayal of homosexual characters, it has been met with continued critical acclaim and won several major awards, including 18 Primetime Emmy Awards and seven Screen Actors Guild Awards. Additionally, the show received 30 Golden Globe Award nominations (but no wins).

Major awards

Primetime Emmy Awards
The Primetime Emmy Award is an American award bestowed by the Academy of Television Arts & Sciences in recognition of excellence in American primetime television programming. Will & Grace has received 18 awards from 88 nominations, including an award for each main cast member. In addition to this, there have been three times when all four main actors were nominated for their respective category in the same year: 2000, 2001 and 2003.

Screen Actors Guild Awards
The Screen Actors Guild Award is an accolade given by the Screen Actors Guild‐American Federation of Television and Radio Artists to recognize outstanding performances in film and primetime television. Will & Grace has received seven awards from twenty-one nominations.

Golden Globe Awards
The Golden Globe Award is an accolade bestowed by the 93 members of the Hollywood Foreign Press Association, recognizing excellence in film and television, both domestic and foreign. Will & Grace has received 30 nominations.

Television Critics Association Awards
The Television Critics Association Awards are awards presented by the Television Critics Association in recognition of excellence in television. Will & Grace received eight nominations.

Other awards

ADG Excellence in Production Design Awards
The ADG Excellence in Production Design Awards are an award presented annually by the Art Directors Guild to recognize excellence in production design and art direction in the film and television industries. Will & Grace received two awards from four nominations.

American Cinema Editors
Founded in 1950, American Cinema Editorsis an honorary society of film editors that are voted in based on the qualities of professional achievements, their education of others, and their dedication to editing. Will & Grace received one award from three nominations.

American Comedy Awards
The American Comedy Awards are a group of awards presented annually in the United States recognizing performances and performers in the field of comedy, with an emphasis on television comedy and comedy films. Will & Grace received two awards from nine nominations.

American Latino Media Arts Awards
The American Latino Media Arts Award is an award highlighting the best American Latino contributions to music, television, and film. Will & Grace received two nominations.

British Comedy Awards
The British Comedy Awards are an annual awards ceremony in the United Kingdom celebrating notable comedians and entertainment performances of the previous year. Will & Grace received one nomination.

Casting Society of America
Since October 1985, the Casting Society of America has presented the Artios Awards for excellence in casting. Members are honored in over eighteen different theatrical casting categories in simultaneous events held in New York City and Beverly Hills, California. Will & Grace received three awards from nine nominations.

Critics' Choice Television Awards
The Critics' Choice Television Awards have been presented annually by the Broadcast Television Journalists Association since 2011. Will & Grace has received one nomination.

Costume Designers Guild
Founded in 1999, the Costume Designers Awards honors costume designers in Motion Pictures, Television, and Commercials annually. Will & Grace received three nominations.

Directors Guild of America Awards
The Directors Guild of America Awards are issued annually by the Directors Guild of America. The first DGA Award was an “Honorary Life Member” award issued in 1938 to D. W. Griffith. The statues are made by New York firm, Society Awards. Will & Grace received one award from seven nominations.

GLAAD Media Awards
The GLAAD Media Award is an accolade bestowed by the Gay & Lesbian Alliance Against Defamation to recognize and honor various branches of the media for their outstanding representations of the lesbian, gay, bisexual and transgender (LGBT) community and the issues that affect their lives. Will & Grace received seven awards from eight nominations.

Gracie Awards

GoldDerby Awards

Hollywood Makeup Artist and Hair Stylist Guild

National Television Awards
The National Television Awards is a British television awards ceremony, broadcast by the ITV network and initiated in 1995. The National Television Awards are the most prominent ceremony for which the results are voted on by the general public. Will & Grace received two nominations.

People's Choice Awards
The People's Choice Awards is an American awards show, recognizing the people and the work of popular culture, voted on by the general public. Will & Grace received two awards.

Producers Guild of America
The Producers Guild of America Award was originally established in 1990 by the Producers Guild of America as the Golden Laurel Awards, created by PGA Treasurer Joel Freeman with the support of Guild President Leonard Stern, in order to honor the visionaries who produce and execute motion picture and television product. Will & Grace received five nominations.

Rose d'Or Light Entertainment Festival
The Rose d'Or (Golden Rose) is an international awards festival in entertainment broadcasting and programming. Will & Grace received one award.

Satellite Awards
The Satellite Awards are annual awards given by the International Press Academy that are commonly noted in entertainment industry journals and blogs. Will & Grace received two awards from nine nominations.

Teen Choice Awards
The Teen Choice Awards is an annual awards show that airs on the Fox television network. The awards honor the year's biggest achievements in music, movies, sports, television, fashion, and more, voted by adolescent viewers (ages 10 to 15). Will & Grace received three awards from fourteen nominations.

TV Guide Awards
The TV Guide Award was an annual award created by the editors of TV Guide magazine, as a readers poll to honor outstanding programs and performers in the American television industry. Will & Grace received two awards from four nominations.

TV Land Awards
The TV Land Awards is an American television awards ceremony that generally commemorates shows now off the air, rather than in current production as with the Emmys. Will & Grace received two nominations.

Viewers for Quality Television Awards
Viewers for Quality Television was an American nonprofit organization founded in 1984 to advocate network television series that members of the organization voted to be of the "highest quality."  The group's goal was to rescue "...critically acclaimed programs from cancellation despite their Nielsen program rating." Will & Grace received one award from eleven nominations.

Writers Guild of America Awards
The Writers Guild of America Awards for outstanding achievements in film, television, radio, and video game writing, including both fiction and non-fiction categories, have been presented annually by the Writers Guild of America, East and Writers Guild of America, West since 1949. Will & Grace has received two nominations.

Young Artist Awards
The Young Artist Award is an accolade bestowed by the Young Artist Association, a non-profit organization founded in 1978 to honor excellence of youth performers, and to provide scholarships for young artists who may be physically and/or financially challenged. Will & Grace received one nomination.

References

Will and Grace
Awards